Doto kya is a species of sea slug, a nudibranch, a marine gastropod mollusc in the family Dotidae.

Distribution

This species was first described from California. It has been reported from the Pacific coasts of Mexico, the United States and Canada.

Description
This nudibranch is white or pale brown in colour with dark brown or black markings on the body.

EcologyDoto kya'' feeds on hydroids.

See also
List of short species names

References

Dotidae
Gastropods described in 1961